The 1998 Singapore Open was a men's tennis tournament played on Indoor Hard in Singapore, Singapore that was part of the Championship Series of the 1998 ATP Tour. It was the seventh edition of the tournament and was held from 12 October – 18 October.

Champions

Singles

 Marcelo Ríos def.  Mark Woodforde, 6–4, 6–2.

Doubles

 Todd Woodbridge /  Mark Woodforde def.  Mahesh Bhupathi /  Leander Paes, 6–2, 6–3.

References

Singapore Open
Singapore Open (men's tennis)